Sharanagati (Sanskrit: शरणागति; IAST: Śaraṇāgati ) or Prapatti (Sanskrit: प्रपत्ति; IAST: Prapatti), is the process of total surrender to God (Narayana-Krishna) in the tradition of Vaishnavism. The process of Sharanagati forms the basis of devotion to Vishnu in the bhakti traditions within the Sri Sampradaya, propounded by Ramanuja (1017–1137 CE), and the Gaudiya Sampradaya, founded by Chaitanya Mahaprabhu (1482–1533 CE). Ramanuja considered surrender to Vishnu and his consort Lakshmi to be the highest goal of life, while Chaitanya emphasised surrender to Krishna and his consort Radha as supreme.

Literature
Sri Vaishnava texts offer their recognition of the practice of Sharanagati. Yamunacharya posited this approach as an alternative to the conventional practices of seeking salvation:

Vedanta Desika's commentary on this sloka offers his perspective:

Initiation
The formal ritual of Sharanagati is a Vedic and Puranic scriptural and tradition backed ritual called the Pancha-Samskara, or "the five impressions", and another name is Samashrayanam. The individual receives the following:
 Nama Samskara - An initiation 'spiritual' name such as a name of Vishnu, or one of his devotees (such as Ramanuja), suffixed with the word dasa (meaning "servant", or servant of). Examples of these could be Vishnu dasa, or Ramanuja dasa. 
 Pundra Samskara - Application of the tiruman, or the Urdhva Pundra, on the forehead and 12 marks on certain parts of the body, which signifies that the individual belong to Vishnu, and that their bodies, minds, and souls are the temples of Lakshmi-Narayana. 
 Thapa Samskara - Special branding on the shoulders of the conch (Panchajanya) and the chakra (Sudarshana) of Vishnu by a guru. 
 Yajna Samskara - Learning to perform the archana or puja, or ritual worship, of Lakshmi-Narayana from the guru. 
 Mantra Samskara - Learning three special mantras dedicated to Vishnu from the guru.

Principles

Sri Vaishnavism 
In the Sri Vaishnava tradition, the Sharanagati is divided into six principles:
Accepting those things that are favorable for devotion to God (anukulyasya sankalpa)
Rejecting those things that are averse to surrender to God (pratikulyasya varjanam)
Considering God to be one's protector in all circumstances (raksisyatiti visvasa)
Accepting God as one's maintainer (goptrtve varanam)
Surrendering everything in God's service (atma-niksepa)
Cultivating a humble attitude (karpanya)

Gaudiya Vaishnavism 
In the Gaudiya tradition, the Sharanagati is divided into ten principles:
Dainya
Atma Nivedana
Goptritve Varana
Avasya Raksibe Krsna Visvasa Palana- Rejection of activities harmful to devotional service
Bhakti Anukula Matra Karyera Svikara
Bhakti Pratikula Bhava Varjanangikara
Bhajan Lalasa
Siddhi Lalasa
Vijnapti
Sri Nama Mahatmya

Five Limbs 
In the philosophy of Vishistadvaita, the Saranagati bears 5 elements: the five limbs, referred to as angas, and the adherent of these, known as an angi.
 Acknowledgement of one's helplessness
 Determination to not err again
 Vowing to follow the rules
Possessing an unshakeable faith that God is the sole refuge
Seeking God as one's protector

References

 The Hindu newspaper dated january 08-Sunday-2017 (article: Tiruppavai leads us to Sri Vaikuntha) Special Issue - Vaikunta Ekadasi
 Sri Vaishnavism: an Elementary treatise for beginners, published Sri Thillasthanam Swamy Kainkarya Sabha, Bangalore India & the Sri Vishishtadvaita Research Centre, Madras India

Vaishnavism
Bhakti movement
Sri Vaishnavism
Hinduism
Hindu philosophy